I Need to Know may refer to:

"I Need to Know" (Tom Petty and the Heartbreakers song), a 1978 song by Tom Petty
"I Need to Know" (Marc Anthony song), a 1999 song by Marc Anthony
"I Need to Know" (Sleeping with Sirens song), 2017
I Need to Know (TV series), a Nigerian television series
"I Need to Know", a 2009 song by Kris Allen from his album Kris Allen

See also
Need to know